Veaceslav is a given name. Notable people with the name include:

Veaceslav Gojan (born 1983), Moldovan amateur boxer who won Bantamweight bronze at the 2008 Olympics
Veaceslav Ioniţă (born 1973), economist and politician from Moldova
Veaceslav Iordan (born 1966), Moldovan politician who served as interim general mayor of Chişinău
Veaceslav Negruţă, Moldovan politician
Veaceslav Platon, Moldovan politician
Veaceslav Sofroni (born 1984), Moldovan professional football player
Veaceslav Ţâbuleac, journalist from the Republic of Moldova
Veaceslav Untilă (born 1956), Moldovan politician

See also
Viacheslav
Vyacheslav (disambiguation)
Václav (disambiguation)

Romanian masculine given names